The Telangana Legislative Council or Telangana Saasana Mandali is the upper house of the Telangana Legislature of the Indian state of Telangana; the lower house being the Telangana Legislative Assembly. It is situated in the state capital of Hyderabad, and has 40 members. The Vidhan Parishad has been in existence from 2 June 2014 after bifurcation from the state of Andhra Pradesh.

Current members
Telangana Legislative Council has its members represented from TRS, INC, AIMIM parties only. BJP has no representation in the House. The Only BJP member Ramchander Rao who represented the Mahboobnagar-Rangareddy-Hyderabad constituency from 2015-2021 lost in the 2021 elections.
The following list includes the members:

 14 members elected by MLAs (1/3rd): 13 from TRS, 1 from AIMIM
 14 members from local authorities (1/3rd): 13 from TRS, 1 from AIMIM
 6 members nominated by the Governor (1/6th): 6 from TRS
 3 members elected by teachers of the state (1/12th): No Affiliation
 3 members elected by graduates (1/12th): 2 from TRS, 1 from INC

Elected by the Legislative Assembly members
Keys:

Elected by the local Authorities
Keys:

Elected from Graduates constituencies
Keys:

Elected from Teachers Constituencies
Keys:

Nominated by Governor
Keys:

Old Members from 2007

See also 
List of members of the Telangana Legislative Council

References

 
2014 establishments in Telangana